Naradhan Keralathil is a 1987 Indian Malayalam-language satirical film, directed by Crossbelt Mani and produced by Jayasree Mani. The film stars Jagathy Sreekumar, Mukesh, Nedumudi Venu and Hari in the lead roles. The film has musical score by M. K. Arjunan.

Cast

 Nedumudi Venu as Naradhan
 Jagathy Sreekumar as Mathan
 Mukesh as Narayanan Namboothiri
 Hari as Lord Vishnu
 Ravi Menon as Lord Siva
 C. I. Paul as Indran
 Ratheesh as Sub Inspector
 Bahadoor as Police Constable Kuttan Pillai
 Kuthiravattam Pappu as Police Constable Appukkuttan
 Bobby Kottarakkara as Police Constable Peppatti Poulose
 Kaduvakulam Antony as Police Constable Annyayam Ousepp 
 Thodupuzha Vasanthi as Police Constable Saramma
 Balan K. Nair as Menon
 Vijayaraghavan as Khader
 Lalithasree as Pattalam Janaki 
 Shari as Kausalya
 Vettoor Purushan as Lambodharna
 Poojapura Soman Nair

Soundtrack
The music was composed by M. K. Arjunan and the lyrics were written by P. Bhaskaran.

References

External links
 

1987 films
1980s Malayalam-language films